Alfred R. Lea (July 10, 1853 – September 8, 1931)  was an American businessman and politician.

Born in Oshkosh, Wisconsin, Lea was a clothing merchant in Waupaca, Wisconsin and also owned several general stores in New London, Wisconsin and Iola, Wisconsin. Lea served on the Waupaca Common Council and as mayor of Waupaca. In 1891, Lea served in the Wisconsin State Assembly and was a Democrat. Lea committed suicide with a firearm at his home in Waupaca, Wisconsin because of ill health and financial difficulties.

Notes

1853 births
1931 deaths
Politicians from Oshkosh, Wisconsin
People from Waupaca, Wisconsin
Businesspeople from Wisconsin
Mayors of places in Wisconsin
Wisconsin city council members
Democratic Party members of the Wisconsin State Assembly
American politicians who committed suicide
Suicides by firearm in Wisconsin